Aji River is one of the main rivers of saurashtra (region), Gujarat State. Aji I dam on this river is called the lifeline of Rajkot City and separates Rajkot in east-west parts. There are four dams on Aji River, the water from which is used for agriculture and as drinking water.

Reservoirs
Rajkot - Aji I Reservoir
Rajkot - Aji II Reservoir
Padadhari - Aji III Reservoir
 Jodiya - Aji IV Reservoir

Purification Project
Rajkot Municipal Corporation has started project for the purification of Aji River and to provide retaining walls and plantations at both ends. Originating from the hilly areas of Sardhar and Hingolgadh, it has a length of 250 km and flows into the Gulf of Kutch. Some of the major tributaries of Aji are the Nyari, Khokaldadi, Bhankudi & Dondi rivers originating from the hills of Sardhar near Atkot. There are major irrigation projects on Aji, but none of them support any canal system for irrigation.

But recently in June 2017, the Prime minister inaugurated the filling of Aji dam near Rajkot under Sauni Yojana. Sauni stands for Saurashtra Narmada Avtaran Irrigation, is envisaged to fill dams across Shaurashtra by diverting floodwaters from Sardar Sarovar dam across Narmada river, through pipelines.

References

Rivers of Gujarat
Rajkot
Rivers of India